Diwan Bahadur Agaram Subbarayalu Reddiar (b. 15 October 1855 – d. November 1921) was a landlord and Chief Minister or Premier of Madras Presidency from 17 December 1920 to 11 July 1921.

Subbarayalu Reddiar was born in a Reddiar family of South Arcot in 1855. He studied law in the West. On his return to India, Subbarayalu Reddiar involved himself in district politics of South Arcot and served as a district board president. Initially, he joined the Indian National Congress but left the party in 1916 to join the Justice Party. When the Justice Party was elected to power in the Madras Presidency in the first general elections in November 1920, Subbarayalu Reddiar was chosen as Chief Minister. Thus, Subbarayalu Reddiar is the first Chief Minister of Madras Presidency.

Subbarayalu Reddiar served as Chief Minister till 11 July 1921 when he resigned on grounds of health. He died soon afterwards.

Early life 

Agaram Subbarayalu Reddiar was born in a rich landlord family domiciled in South Arcot district of Madras Presidency on 15 October 1855. He studied in Presidency College, Chennai, along with Theagaroya Chetty. Later he studied law in the United Kingdom.

Early political career 

Subbarayalu Reddiar served as the President of Cuddalore taluk Board in 1912. In 1917 he became the chair of South Arcot District Board. He later became the first Chief Minister of Madras Presidency, present-day state of Tamil Nadu.

Chief Minister of Madras 

At the end of November 1920, the first general elections were held to the Madras Legislative Assembly as per the Montford Reforms. The Indian National Congress, a part of its policy during the Non-Cooperation Movement boycotted the elections. As a result, the Justice Party swept to power winning 63 of the 98 Assembly seats to which elections were conducted. Among the nominated members, it had a strength of 18 adding up to a total of 81 members in a chamber of 127.

Following the success of the Justice Party in the 1920 elections, Lord Willingdon invited Sir Theagaroya Chetty to form the Government. However, he passed on the mantle to Subbarayalu Reddiar. Subbarayalu Reddiar assumed office as Chief Minister on 17 December 1920 and held the portfolios of education, public works, excise and registration in the new government. The first session of the assembly was inaugurated by Duke of Connaught on 13 January 1921. On 14 February 1921, three new Council Secretaries were appointed by the Justice party Government. However, Subbarayalu Reddiar resigned soon afterwards on grounds of health.

Death 

Subbarayalu Reddiar died in November 1921.

Notes

References 

 

1855 births
1921 deaths
Telugu politicians
Chief Ministers of Tamil Nadu
Presidency College, Chennai alumni
Dewan Bahadurs